Sam Ball (born June 1, 1944) is a former American football offensive lineman who played in the National Football League (NFL) from 1966 through 1970. During that span he appeared in Super Bowl III and Super Bowl V for the Baltimore Colts. He played college football at the University of Kentucky.

He was also drafted in 1966 by the Jets in the 2nd round, 15th overall.  1966 was the last year of separate drafts by the NFL and AFL.

On January 12, 1969, Ball was the starting offensive right tackle for the Colts against the Jets in Super Bowl III.  He missed out on a Super Bowl ring as the Jets won 16–7, but won one two years later in Super Bowl V.

The Jets drafted Sam Walton at right tackle in 1968, who struggled as a rookie before being replaced in the playoffs by Dave Herman who moved across from right guard.  Ball's choice of signing with the Colts over the Jets influenced the drafting of Walton as Ball would have been used to replace Sherman Plunkett.

1944 births
Living people
People from Henderson, Kentucky
Players of American football from Kentucky
American football offensive tackles
Kentucky Wildcats football players
All-American college football players
Baltimore Colts players
New York Jets players